Bolor-Tagh is an old name for the longitudinal range in eastern Pamir Mountains (ancient Mount Imeon) extending from Kunlun Mountains in the south to the east extremity of the Trans-Alay Range in the north.  Highest peaks Kongur Tagh (7649 m) and Muztagh Ata. Bolor-Tagh lies entirely in the Xinjiang province of western China. Marco Polo visited the area in 1271 during his travel to China, describing it under the name of ‘Bolor’.

References

 Meyers Konversationslexikon. Verlag des Bibliographischen Instituts, Leipzig und Wien, Vierte Auflage, 1885–1892.
 Brockhaus' Konversationslexikon. F. A. Brockhaus in Leipzig, Berlin und Wien, 14. Auflage, 1894–1896.
 Polo, Marco and Rustichello of Pisa.  The Travels of Marco Polo, Vol. 1. Ed. Henry Yule (1903), and Henry Cordier (1920). Gutenberg Project, 2004.

Mountain ranges of Xinjiang